The 40th German Skeleton Championship 2006 was organized on 7 March 2006 in Winterberg.

Men

Women

External links 
 Resultlist at the BSD Site

Skeleton championships in Germany
2006 in German sport
2006 in skeleton